The 2011 Liga Super Malaysia is the eighth season of the Malaysia Super League, the top-tier professional football league in Malaysia. The season was held from 29 January and concluded on 30 July 2011. Selangor is the current defending champions.

Teams
A total of fourteen teams will contest the league, including twelve sides from the 2010 season and two promoted teams from the 2010 Malaysia Premier League. Johor and Penang were relegated at the end of last season league after finishing the season in the bottom two places of the league table. 2010 Malaysia Premier League champions Felda United and runners-up Sabah secured direct promotion to the Malaysia Super League. 

Harimau Muda A secured a place in the Malaysia Super League after PLUS withdrew. Harimau had won the 2009 Malaysia Premier League before playing the 2010 campaign in the Slovak First League. Harimau represent the Malaysian Under 23 national football team.

Vanues

Personnel and kits

Coaching changes

 1Ahmad Yusof was put on indefinite leave on 7 March 2011, but is still contracted to Kedah FA. His contract was only terminated by mutual consent on 22 April 2011. Subsequently, he joined Penang as head coach on 1 May 2011.

League table

Results

Season statistics

Top scorers

See also
 List of Liga Super seasons
 2011 Liga Premier

References

Malaysia Super League seasons
1
Malaysia
Malaysia